The R742 road is a regional road in County Wexford, Ireland. From its junction with the R772 in Gorey it takes a southerly route to its junction with the R741 north of Wexford Town where it terminates. 

Though the road passes through many popular seaside resorts and villages undergoing extensive growth, it remains virtually unchanged since it was first paved with long stretches of narrow, winding, unmarked and worn surfacing (as of 2007). 

See also
Roads in Ireland
National primary road
National secondary road

References
Roads Act 1993 (Classification of Regional Roads) Order 2006 – Department of Transport

Regional roads in the Republic of Ireland
Roads in County Wexford